Devry may refer to:

DeVry Inc, U.S. corporation that runs DeVry University, DeVry Institute of Technology and other for-profit schools
DeVry University
Elaine Devry (born 1930), American actress
William deVry (born 1968), Canadian actor

See also
De Vries